Grzegorz Tomasiewicz (born 5 May 1996) is a Polish professional footballer who plays as a midfielder for Piast Gliwice.

Club career
He made his I liga debut for Arka Gdynia on 9 May 2015 in a game against Bytovia Bytów.

References

External links
 

1996 births
People from Jaworzno
Living people
Polish footballers
Poland youth international footballers
Legia Warsaw II players
Arka Gdynia players
MKP Pogoń Siedlce players
Stal Mielec players
Piast Gliwice players
Ekstraklasa players
I liga players
III liga players
Association football midfielders